Bizot is a surname. Notable people with the surname include:

Christian Bizot (1928–2002), French winemaker, head of the Bollinger Champagne house
François Bizot (born 1940), French anthropologist
Henry Bizot (1901–1990), French banker, first chairman of Banque Nationale de Paris, father of Christian
Marco Bizot (born 1991), Dutch football goalkeeper
Maurice Bizot, (1896–1925), French World War I flying ace
Thierry Bizot (born 1962), French television producer and author

See also
Le Bizot, France